Tayr Falsay  is a small town in Tyre District in Southern Lebanon, located just south of the Litani river and 14 kilometres northeast of Tyre.

Name
According to E. H. Palmer, the name means  the fortress of the scales or small coins.

History

In 1881, the PEF's Survey of Western Palestine (SWP) described it: "A village built of stone; about 250 Metawileh; on side of hill near the top, with figs and arable land around. There are two springs, and cisterns."

References

Bibliography

External links
Tayr Falsay, Localiban
Survey of Western Palestine, Map 2:   IAA, Wikimedia commons

Populated places in the Israeli security zone 1985–2000
Populated places in Tyre District
Shia Muslim communities in Lebanon